Lukas Nelson & Promise of the Real, sometimes referred to as POTR, is an American country rock group based in California. The band consists of Lukas Nelson (lead vocals, guitar), Anthony LoGerfo (drums, percussion), Corey McCormick (bass guitar, vocals), Logan Metz (keyboards, lap steel, guitar, harmonica, vocals), and Tato Melgar (percussion). Lukas is the son of Willie Nelson. Lukas Nelson & Promise of The Real has released 6 studio albums and 4 EP's.

From 2015 to 2019, Promise of the Real were Canadian musician Neil Young's regular backing band. With Young, the band has recorded two studio albums, The Monsanto Years (2015) and The Visitor (2017), a soundtrack album, Paradox (2018), and two live albums, Earth (2016) and Noise & Flowers (2022). When backing Young, the band is typically expanded to include Nelson’s younger brother, Micah Nelson.

History

Formation of Promise of the Real
Lukas Autry Nelson moved from Paia, Hawaii to Los Angeles in 2007 to attend Loyola Marymount University where he met and became friends with future keyboardist and multi-instrumentalist Logan Metz, who later joined the band in 2018. In 2008, Nelson met then-current if all else fails drummer Anthony LoGerfo at a Neil Young concert, where they bonded over their shared love of rock music. They began playing music together regularly after Lukas dropped out of college in October, 2008. They enlisted Tato Melgar (percussionist), and Merlyn Kelly (bassist) to form POTR.

Live Beginnings (2008–2009) 
The band played its first shows in the fall of 2008, selling its first EP Live Beginnings to pay for touring. The album contained live tracks recorded at the “Belly Up Bar” venue in Solana Beach, California.

In January 2009, the band began a nine-show tour opening for Willie Nelson, including a five-night stop at The Fillmore in San Francisco. Following that tour the band embarked on a two-week tour with B.B. King through Wyoming, Utah, Colorado, and Nebraska.

Brando's Paradise Sessions EP (2009)
In April 2009, Promise of the Real released its first studio EP, Brando’s Paradise Sessions. Its cover art became the basis for the band's peace sign logo.

Original bassist Merlyn Kelly left the band in 2009. Corey McCormick became the band's bass player in 2010. McCormick had performed with Chris Cornell of Soundgarden.

Promise of the Real Touring Appearances (2010–2012) 
The band released its first album, Promise of the Real, in December 2010.

Promise of the Real was recorded in Austin, Texas at Pedernales Studios in March 2010. Album engineer Steve Chadie's 6-year-old daughter provided the cover art. The album also contains a booklet of paintings and illustrations created on stage by Lukas's brother, Micah, during the band's concerts.

The album consists of 12 tracks and one bonus track. The band paid homage to two influences, Jimi Hendrix and Neil Young, in the songs “Pali Gap/Hey Baby" and “L.A.” The band covered “Peaceful Solution”, a song written by Lukas's father, Willie Nelson, and his sister Amy Niccore. And Willie sang back up on “Sound of Your Memory” and “Fathers and Mothers”. Lukas's aunt, Bobbie Nelson, played piano on "Fathers and Mothers".

Lukas Nelson and Promise of the Real played more than 200 shows across the United States during 2011, promoting “Promise of the Real”. Major festival appearances included Stagecoach, Farm Aid, Bridge School Benefit, Sturgis Buffalo Chip Campground, and Willie Nelson's Country Throwdown Tour. The band also made national TV appearances on The Tonight Show with Jay Leno, Jimmy Kimmel Live!, and the Late Show with David Letterman.

The band frequently opened shows for Willie Nelson in 2012 during which Lukas played with his father's band.

Wasted (2012)
The band released its second studio album, Wasted, on April 3, 2012. Following the album's release, the band embarked on a national tour at Antone's Nightclub in Austin, Texas.

The band was featured on a webcast through Yahoo Music that was shot at TRI Studios, Bob Weir’s studio. The webcast aired on April 17, 2012 and has been viewed by hundreds of thousands. The band was featured as the homepage artist on Yahoo music.

On May 1, 2012, Live Nation announced that Lukas Nelson & Promise of the Real would back John Fogerty on his coast-to-coast tour of Canada in September 2012.

Willie Nelson's Heroes (2012)
Willie Nelson’s album Heroes released on May 15, 2012, featured Lukas on 10 of the 14 tracks.

Willie and Promise of the Real performed a cover of Pearl Jam’s "Just Breathe" live on Willie's Roadhouse channel on Sirius XM on May 15, 2012. Lukas and his father performed "Texas Flood" on Late Night with Jimmy Fallon on May 14, 2012.

Collaborations with Neil Young
Neil Young jammed with Lukas Nelson & Promise of the Real after Farm Aid 2014.

The Monsanto Years (2015)
In January 2015, Neil Young and the band recorded the concept album The Monsanto Years. The album includes "A Rock Star Bucks A Coffee Shop" which targets Starbucks and its use of genetically-modified food.

The album recording and live rehearsals were filmed by Don Hannah in April 2015 for a film also entitled The Monsanto Years.

Earth (2016)
On June 17, 2016, the live album Earth was released. It was recorded during the Rebel Content Tour in 2015 and featured live performances augmented by studio overdubs and nature and animal sounds.

The Visitor (2017)
On November 3, 2017, Young announced a new album with Promise of the Real. The album, entitled The Visitor, was released December 1 and included a song called "Already Great".

Paradox (2018)
This album is the soundtrack album to Daryl Hannah's film Paradox released on March 23, 2018.

Noise & Flowers (2022)
Noise & Flowers is a live album of selected songs from Young’s tour of Europe in 2019, which was released on August 5, 2022. The tour commenced just two weeks after the passing of Young’s long time manager and friend Elliot Roberts and served as a memorial to their 50 plus years of collaboration.

Lukas Nelson & Promise of the Real (2017)
The band signed with Fantasy Records and released the self-titled album, Lukas Nelson & Promise of the Real on August 25, 2017. The album hit No. 1 on the Americana Radio Chart the week of November 10, 2017 Lady Gaga, with whom Nelson was collaborating on A Star Is Born, provided backing vocals on two tracks. The album earned the band its first Americana Music Awards nomination for Duo/Group of the Year.

Willie Nelson & The Boys (Willie's Stash, Vol. 2) (2017) 
On October 20, 2017, Legacy Recordings released "Willie Nelson and the Boys (Willie’s Stash, Vol. 2)", a family collaboration showcasing Willie, Lukas, and Micah performing a selection of American country music classics, including seven penned by Hank Williams, Sr.

A Star Is Born (2018) 
A Star Is Born, directed by Bradley Cooper and starring Cooper and Lady Gaga, was released in October 2018. Nelson co-produced the music for the film, writing songs with Gaga, after being hired as an authenticity consultant to Cooper. Lukas Nelson & Promise of the Real appear in the film as Cooper's band. Nelson won a BAFTA Award for Best Original Music and Grammy Award for Best Compilation Soundtrack for Visual Media for his work.

Turn Off The News (Build A Garden) (2019) 
Turn Off the News (Build a Garden) marked the band’s fifth studio album release and second studio album release for Fantasy Records. The album was released on June 14, 2019, peaking at No. 19 on Billboard’s US Top Country Albums chart  and 31 on Billboard’s Top Rock Albums chart.

Naked Garden (2020) 

On March 27, 2020, the band released Naked Garden, a 15-track collection that is a companion piece to 2019’s Turn Off the News (Build a Garden). Naked Garden includes previously unreleased versions and alternate takes of songs that were recorded during the Turn Off The News (Build A Garden) sessions at Shangri-La and Village Studios.

A Few Stars Apart (2021) 

On April 28, 2021, the band announced their next studio album release on Fantasy Records, A Few Stars Apart, accompanied by the first single released from the album, "Perennial Bloom (Back To You)."  Available June 11, 2021, the album was recorded at RCA Studio A in Nashville and Produced by Dave Cobb.

Discography

Studio albums

Collaborations

EPs

Live recordings

Other appearances

References

External links

 

2008 establishments in California
Best Original Music BAFTA Award winners
Fantasy Records artists
Grammy Award winners
Musical backing groups
Musical groups established in 2008
Rock music groups from California